Vivek Shanbhag (ವಿವೇಕ ಶಾನಭಾಗ) is an Indian story writer, novelist and playwright in Kannada. He is the author of nine works of fiction and three plays, all of which have been published in Kannada. His works have been translated into English and several other Indian languages. Vivek Shanbhag also worked as editor for the literary magazine "Desha Kaala" for 7 years. "Desha Kaala" was considered as one of the best literary magazines in Kannada.

Shanbhag was a Writer in Residence at the International Writing Program at the University of Iowa during the fall of 2016. Vivek Shanbhag is considered as one of the finest writers of Kannada Literature. "Huli Savaari", "Kantu", "Noolina Eni", "Guruthu", "Langaru", "Ankura", "Mattobbana Samsara", "Sharvana Services", "Ghachar Gochar", "Innu Ondu", "Ondu Badi Kadalu" and "Ooru Bhanga" are his best contribution to the Kannada fiction. His short stories and novels are highly praised by critics. Through his recent novella Ghachar Gochar he got huge recognition as a writer from all over the world.

Works

Collection of Short Stories
 Ankura (1985)
 Langaru (1992)
 Huli Savaari (1995)
 Mattobbana Samsara (2005)

Novella
Ghachar Ghochar (2013)

Novels
 Innu Ondu (2001)
 Ondu Badi Kadalu (2007)
 Ooru Bhanga (2015)
 Sakinala Muttu (2021)

Plays
 Sakkare Gombe (1999)
 Bahumukhi (2007)
 Illiruvudu Summane (2021)

Editor
 Sirigannada [English] (2001)
 Srikrishna Alanahalli Vaachike (2010)

References

https://www.nytimes.com/2017/04/06/books/review/ghachar-ghochar-vivek-shanbhag.html

https://www.irishtimes.com/culture/books/ghachar-ghochar-review-literary-perfection-from-indian-master-1.3054001

https://www.independent.co.uk/arts-entertainment/books/reviews/ghachar-ghochar-vivek-shanbhag-book-review-a7690991.html 
 
https://www.theguardian.com/books/2017/apr/27/ghachar-ghochar-vivek-shanbhag-review

Living people
21st-century Indian male writers
Kannada-language writers
Kannada dramatists and playwrights
1962 births